Pierre-Luc may refer to:

Pierre-Luc Brillant (born 1978), Canadian actor and musician
Pierre-Luc Caron (born 1993), professional Canadian football long snapper
Pierre-Luc-Charles Cicéri (1782–1868), leading French set designer
Pierre-Luc Dubois (born 1998), Canadian professional ice hockey centre
Pierre-Luc Dusseault (born 1991), Canadian politician, Member of Parliament
Pierre-Luc Gagnon, aka PLG (born 1980), Canadian professional skateboarder
Pierre-Luc Labbé (born 1984), former professional Canadian football linebacker
Pierre-Luc Laforest aka Pete Laforest (born 1978), Canadian former professional baseball catcher
Pierre-Luc Létourneau-Leblond (born 1985), Canadian former professional ice hockey left winger
Pierre-Luc Périchon (born 1987), French professional road and track bicycle racer
Pierre-Luc Poulin (born 1995), Canadian sprint kayaker
Pierre-Luc Séguillon (1940–2010), French columnist and journalist
Pierre-Luc Sleigher (born 1982), Canadian professional ice hockey player
Pierre-Luc Thériault (born 1993), Canadian table tennis player
Pierre-Luc Yao (born 1982), former professional Canadian football running back